The Fort Pato Nature Reserve is one of two inland forest reserves in the greater East London Coast Nature Reserve, located in the Wild Coast region of the Eastern Cape, South Africa. The reserve lies on the southern bank of the Buffalo River next to the Bridle Drift Dam Nature Reserve and down to the R346.

History 
This  reserve was created in 1973 for the conservation of the region's fauna and flora.

See also 

 List of protected areas of South Africa

References 

Nature reserves in South Africa
Eastern Cape Provincial Parks